The Last Train is a 2002 Uruguayan and Argentine, comedy drama film, directed by Diego Arsuaga, and written by Arsuaga, Fernando León de Aranoa, and Beda Docampo Feijóo. It's also known as Corazón de fuego in Argentina.

The film's executive producer was Mariela Besuievski, and it was produced by Pablo Bossi, Gerardo Herrero, Oscar Kramer, and Carlos Mentasti.

Synopsis
The film tells of an ambitious business man (Pauls) who wants to sell train 33, affectionately known as "Corazón de fuego," to a company in Hollywood. A group of elderly men known as "The Friends of the Rails" think that to do so would be to sell an important part of the country's history and so devise to steal the train.

The group of hijackers is led by "El Professor" (Alterio), and the train itself is driven by Pepe, who claims to have learned how to do so during the Spanish Civil War. The group is also accompanied by Dante Minetti (Soriano), who suffers from Alzheimer's, and Guito, Pepe's neighbor/friend's nine-year-old great-nephew. The escapade takes the train all across the small country, exhibiting Uruguay's vibrant landscape and varied climate, also revealing many abandoned towns and train stops.

Cast
 Héctor Alterio as El Profesor
 Federico Luppi as Pepe
 Pepe Soriano as Dante
 Gastón Pauls as Jimmy Ferreira
 Balaram Dinard as Guito
 Eduardo Miglionico as Ponce
 Elisa Contreras as Micaela
 Saturnino García as De León
 Jenny Goldstein as Notera
 Alfonso Tort as Daniel

Distribution
The film was released wide in Uruguay May 31, 2002, and in Argentina on August 22, 2002.

The picture was screened at various film festivals, including: the Montréal World Film Festival, Canada; the Palm Springs International Film Festival, United States; the Cinémas d'Amérique Latine de Toulouse, France; the Copenhagen International Film Festival, Denmark; the Hamburg Film Festival, Germany; and others.

Awards
Wins
 Montréal World Film Festival: Best Latin-American Feature Film, Diego Arsuaga; Best Screenplay, Diego Arsuaga; Prize of the Ecumenical Jury, Diego Arsuaga; 2002.
 Uruguayan Film Critics Association: UFCA Award; Best Uruguayan Film; 2002.
 Valladolid International Film Festival: Best Actor, Héctor Alterio, Federico Luppi, and José Soriano; Best New Director, Diego Arsuaga; 2002.
 Ariel Awards, Mexico: Silver Ariel; Best Latin-American Film, Uruguay; 2003.
 Goya Awards: Goya; Best Spanish Language Foreign Film, Diego Arsuaga, Uruguay; 2003.
 Gramado Film Festival: Audience Award Latin Film Competition, Diego Arsuaga; Special Jury Award Latin Film Competition, Diego Arsuaga; 2003.
 Lima Latin American Film Festival: Elcine Second Prize, Diego Arsuaga; 2003.

Nominations
 Montréal World Film Festival: Grand Prix des Amériques, Diego Arsuaga; 2002.
 Valladolid International Film Festival: Golden Spike, Diego Arsuaga; 2002.
 Argentine Film Critics Association Awards: Silver Condor, Best Actor, Héctor Alterio; Best Actor, José Soriano; Best Music, Hugo Jasa; 2003.

References

External links
 .
 Corazón de fuego at the cinenacional.com .
 

2002 films
2002 comedy-drama films
Argentine independent films
Rail transport films
2002 independent films
2000s road comedy-drama films
2000s Spanish-language films
Spanish independent films
Uruguayan independent films
Argentine comedy-drama films
Spanish road comedy-drama films
Uruguayan comedy-drama films
Films set in Uruguay
Films shot in Uruguay
2000s Argentine films